3330 or variant, may refer to:

In general
 A.D. 3330, a year in the 4th millennium CE
 3330 BC, a year in the 4th millennium BCE
 3330, a number in the 3000 (number) range

Products
 IBM 3330, a hard disk drive
 Nokia 3330, a cellphone
 ALFA-PROJ Model 3330, a handgun

Other uses
 3330 Gantrisch, an asteroid in the Asteroid Belt, the 3330th asteroid registered
 Texas Farm to Market Road 3330, a state highway

See also